La Chapelle-Heulin is a commune in the Loire-Atlantique department in western France.

Geography

La Chapelle-Heulin  is situated in 13,6702 miles east of Nantes, 19,8839 miles south of Ancenis and 26,719 miles west of Cholet. The neighbouring communes of La Chapelle-Heulin are Le Loroux-Bottereau, Le Landreau, Vallet, Le Pallet, La Haie-Fouassière and Haute-Goulaine.

Population

Personalities
Aristide Briand, politician

See also
Communes of the Loire-Atlantique department

References

Communes of Loire-Atlantique